Babari Banda railway station is a railway station in Khyber Pakhtunkhwa Province, located in northwest Pakistan.

See also
 List of railway stations in Pakistan
 Pakistan Railways

References

Railway stations in Kohat District
Railway stations on Khushalgarh–Kohat–Thal Railway